Patrick Michael Jobson (born 4 April 1967) is a former English cricketer.  Jobson was a right-handed batsman who bowled right-arm medium pace.  He was born in Oxford, Oxfordshire.

Jobson made his debut for Oxfordshire in the 1986 Minor Counties Championship against Shropshire.  Jobson played Minor counties cricket for Oxfordshire from 1986 to 2001, which included 45 Minor Counties Championship matches and 13 MCCA Knockout Trophy matches.  He made his List A debut against Gloucestershire in the 1989 NatWest Trophy.  He played 5 further List A matches, the last coming against Somerset in the 1994 NatWest Trophy.  In his 6 List A matches, he scored 50 runs at a batting average of 10.00, with a high score of 30.

He had previously played Second XI cricket for the Essex Second XI.

References

External links
Patrick Jobson at ESPNcricinfo
Patrick Jobson at CricketArchive

1967 births
Living people
Cricketers from Oxford
English cricketers
Oxfordshire cricketers